Hats Off Step Lively is the fifth studio album by Australian blues/rock band Jo Jo Zep & The Falcons. The album was released in August 1980 and peaked at number 17 on the Australian Kent Music Report, becoming the band's second top twenty album.  The band toured the album across Australian throughout August and September 1980.

The album was released internationally under the title Step Lively in September 1981, with additional recordings and new cover art.

Track listing

Charts

References 

1980 albums
Jo Jo Zep & The Falcons albums
Mushroom Records albums